J. Robert "Bob" Stassen (August 15, 1927 – October 15, 2015) was an American businessman, Baptist minister, and politician.

Early life and education
Stassen was born in West St. Paul, Minnesota; his uncle was Harold Stassen, who served as governor of Minnesota. Stassen graduated from South St. Paul High School and then served in the United States Navy during World War II. In 1951, Stassen received his Bachelor of Arts degree in philosophy from the University of Minnesota. He received a specialist degree from the Bethel Seminary and attended the William Mitchell College of Law.

Career 
Stassen worked in the life insurance and banking businesses. He was also the president of the West St. Paul State Bank. From 1973 to 1976, Stassen served in the Minnesota Senate as a Republican. In 1974, Stassen was the Republican nominee for Minnesota state treasurer, losing to Jim Lord.

In 1981, Stassen was appointed to the Metropolitan Airports Commission.

Personal life 
Stassen died in West St. Paul, Minnesota.

References

1927 births
2015 deaths
People from West St. Paul, Minnesota
University of Minnesota College of Liberal Arts alumni
William Mitchell College of Law alumni
Baptist ministers from the United States
Businesspeople from Minnesota
Military personnel from Minnesota
Republican Party Minnesota state senators
20th-century American businesspeople